The Greenleaf & Crosby Building is a historic site in Jacksonville, Florida. It is located at 208 N Laura Street. The antique Greenleaf Clock is on the corner - it was moved from the company's original location and has been refurbished multiple times.  On March 15, 2005, it was added to the U.S. National Register of Historic Places.

See also
Architecture of Jacksonville

References

External links
 
 Duval County listings at National Register of Historic Places
 Downtown Jacksonville - Development

Buildings and structures in Jacksonville, Florida
History of Jacksonville, Florida
National Register of Historic Places in Jacksonville, Florida
Chicago school architecture in Florida
Downtown Jacksonville
Northbank, Jacksonville
Office buildings completed in 1928
Laura Street